Matthew Parr (born 17 July 1986) is a British racing driver from Horsham, West Sussex who currently competes in Formula Ford 1600.

Career

Matthew Parr starting racing go-karts aged 8. In 2008 he moved up to race in Formula Ford 1600 with Team West-Tec finishing 2nd in the Formula Ford M/S Championship. In the same year he also competed in the Formula Ford Festival, the Walter Hayes Trophy and came second in the 2008 Powernights Event.

In 2009 he moved teams to race with newly formed Unitec Motorsport and competed in the Formula Ford 1600 National Championship finishing in 4th place overall, including 1 win at Brands Hatch.

For 2010 he had intended to race in the British Formula Ford Championship, but could not find the required funding to compete in the series. Instead he is currently racing for Unitec Motorsport in Formula Ford 1600 and has won the Champion of Brands.

External links
Official Website

English racing drivers
1986 births
Living people
Formula Ford drivers
People from Horsham